Thomas David "T.D." Thomas (February 19, 1899 – July 30, 1980) was a politician in Ontario, Canada. He was a CCF member of the Legislative Assembly of Ontario. He represented the ridings of Ontario from 1948 to 1955, and Oshawa from 1955 to 1963.

Background
Thomas, who was known as "Tommy" or by his initials as "T.D. Thomas", was born in Cardiff, Wales in 1899. He emigrated to Canada in 1929 and worked for General Motors of Canada as a toolmaker.

He sat Board of Education of the Ontario County Township and was a director of the Oshawa General Hospital from 1952 to 1973. His wife Christine served on Oshawa City Council and later as Mayor of Oshawa in 1961 and 1962, the city's first woman mayor.

Politics
Thomas served on the East Whitby Township council and was elected reeve in 1946 and 1947. He ran as the CCF candidate in the 1948 provincial election in the riding of Ontario. He defeated Progressive Conservative incumbent Thomas Creighton by about 2,600 votes. He was re-elected in 1951, 1955, and 1959.

In the 1963 election he ran under the banner of the new party as the New Democrat candidate. He was defeated by PC candidate Albert Walker by 683 votes.

References

External links 
 

1899 births
1980 deaths
Politicians from Cardiff
Ontario Co-operative Commonwealth Federation MPPs
20th-century Canadian politicians